Rougeau is a Canadian surname. Notable people with this surname include:

Armand Rougeau, former professional wrestler
Jacques Rougeau (born 1960), retired French-Canadian professional wrestler
Jean Rougeau (1929–1983), professional wrestler better known as Johnny Rougeau
Lauriane Rougeau (born 1990), Canadian ice hockey player
Raymond Rougeau (born 1955), Canadian wrestler, French language TV presenter and commentator
René Duprée (born 1983), or René Rougeau, Canadian professional wrestler
René Rougeau (born 1986), American professional basketball player
Vincent Rougeau, American scholar of law and theology and academic administrator

See also
The Fabulous Rougeaus, the professional wrestling tag team of real-life brothers Jacques and Raymond Rougeau
Rougeau wrestling family, family of Canadian professional wrestlers
Jean Rougeau Trophy, Quebec Major Junior Hockey League annual award